12767 / 68 Hazur Sahib Nanded Santragachi Junction Express is an Express train belonging to Indian Railways South Central Railway zone that runs between  and  in India.

Service 
It operates as train number 12767 from Hazur Sahib Nanded to Santragachi Junction and as train number 12768 in the reverse direction, serving the states of Maharashtra, Telangana, Chhattisgarh, Odisha, Jharkhand & West Bengal.

Schedule

Rake sharing

 17620/17619 – Aurangabad–Hazur Sahib Nanded Express
 17621/17622 – Aurangabad–Renigunta Express

Coaches

The 12767 / 68 Hazur Sahib Nanded–Santragachi Junction Express has one AC 3-tier, six sleeper class, six general unreserved & two SLR (seating with luggage rake) coaches. It doesn't carry a pantry car.

As with most train services in India, coach composition may be amended at the discretion of Indian Railways depending on demand.

Routing

Traction
As this route is partially electrified, a Moula Ali-based electric WDM-3A pulls the train up to  then a -based diesel WAP-4 loco pulls the train to its destination.

References

External links
12767 Hazur Sahib Nanded–Santragachi Junction Express at India Rail Info
12768 Santragachi Junction–Hazur Sahib Nanded Express at India Rail Info

Express trains in India
Rail transport in Maharashtra
Rail transport in Andhra Pradesh
Rail transport in Chhattisgarh
Rail transport in Odisha
Rail transport in West Bengal
Transport in Nanded
Rail transport in Howrah